The Spezio Sport DAL 1 Tuholer is a two-place low-wing homebuilt aircraft using tube-and-fabric construction. A folding wing is incorporated to allow for trailering.

Development
The prototype aircraft was built for $287 using tubing from a Cessna UC 78, a Tri-Pacer propeller, wheels from a TG-6 glider, a Lycoming Ground Power unit and a variety of surplus materials. The nickname came from the president of the Experimental Aircraft Association remarking that the plane was a "tuholer". (Link does not work)>

Design
The Tuholer is a tandem two-seat, strut-braced, low-wing, open cockpit aircraft with conventional landing gear. The dual control aircraft can be flown solo rear cockpit only. The fuselage is welded steel tubing with wooden stringers and fabric covering. The dual wing spars are wood, with wood ribs and fabric covering. The fuel tank is made of fiberglass. The horizontal stabilizer uses a Piper Cub style screw jack for trim. The rear headrest can be built streamlined flush with the vertical stabilizer or tapered.

Operational history
The designer flew the prototype 16 years.

Specifications (Spezio Tuholer)

References

http://www.pilotfriend.com/experimental/acft6/38.htm

External links

 http://www.crimsonstar.com/home/hbuilt0.htm
 http://www.planeandpilotmag.com/aircraft/international-aircraft-directory/homebuiltkitbuilt-aircraft/spezio-tuholer.html

1960s United States sport aircraft
Homebuilt aircraft
Low-wing aircraft
Single-engined tractor aircraft
Aircraft first flown in 1961